DJ Miki Love (Mihaela Ifrim; born 1984) is a Romanian DJ and dancer, best known for performing in topless in her sets.

Career
She started perforimg in February 2007, in one of the most important clubs Anyin Bucharest, Club Princess, becoming the first topless DJ in Romania. Shortly thereafter, she received invitations from clubs in Bucharest and the in the other large cities in Romania. She became quite successful both nationally and internationally.

Love said she had no difficulty performing topless, because she had previously worked as a dancer. In November 2009 she released her first single, “Black Pussy”, a release that got positive reviews from fans and from Romanian media. The material recorded a success in Netherlands, Belgium, Hungary, Bulgaria, Britain and France.

References 

Women DJs
Club DJs
21st-century women musicians
Romanian DJs
1984 births
Living people